Hey Arnold! is an American animated television series created by Craig Bartlett that aired on Nickelodeon from October 7, 1996 to June 8, 2004. The show centers on fourth grader Arnold Shortman, who lives with his grandparents in an inner-city tenement in the fictional city of Hillwood, Washington. Episodes center on his experiences navigating urban life while dealing with the problems he and his friends encounter. Many episodes however, focus on other characters, including major, secondary, supporting, and even minor characters.

Bartlett's idea for the show is based on a minor character named Arnold whom he created while working on Pee-wee's Playhouse. The executives enjoyed the character, and Bartlett completed the cast and setting by drawing inspiration from people and locations he grew up with in Seattle, Washington, Portland, Oregon, and Brooklyn, New York. Bartlett created the pilot episode in his living room in 1994 and official production began in 1995. The animators worked to transform Arnold from clay animation to cel animation, leading to the series premiere in 1996. Production on the show concluded on December 7, 2001, after 5 seasons and 100 episodes. Its last episode aired unannounced on June 8, 2004. A feature film based on the series, Hey Arnold!: The Movie, was released in theaters on June 28, 2002. All five seasons have been released on DVD.

On March 2, 2016, a television film continuation of the series, Hey Arnold!: The Jungle Movie, was greenlit. It picks up from where the series ended and resolved the unanswered plotlines of the story. The film premiered on November 24, 2017 on Nickelodeon, Nicktoons, TeenNick, NickRewind and on November 24, 2018, as an international theatrical release, wrapping up the series's storyline.

Premise

Setting
Hey Arnold! takes place in the urban fictional American city of Hillwood. Creator Craig Bartlett described the city as "an amalgam of large northern cities I have loved, including Seattle (my hometown), Portland (where I went to art school) and Brooklyn (the bridge, the brownstones, the subway)"; the city also contains inspirations from Chicago, such as a baseball field called Quigley Field (a reference to the real-life Wrigley Field). Evan Levine of the Houston Chronicle commented on the series's "backdrop of dark streets, nighttime adventures and rundown buildings, all seen from a child's point of view."

At the end of the episode "Road Trip", when Helga and Miriam are returning home after having car troubles en route to South Dakota, they pass a sign marking the Washington State border, implying that Hillwood is in Washington. The Pig War, as re-enacted in the episode of the same title, took place on the boundary between what is now British Columbia and the state of Washington. A bridge that leads to downtown Hillwood resembles Portland's Burnside Bridge, while Gerald's house was modeled after the Victorian houses seen in Nob Hill, Portland. New York City (with landmarks such as the Empire State Building, Twin Towers, and Statue of Liberty visible in the skyline) was also seen in Helga's dream in the episode "Married", presumably as a separate city from Hillwood in-universe.

Characters

Hey Arnold! features nine-year-old Arnold Shortman (voiced by Lane Toran; Phillip Van Dyke; Spencer Klein; and Alex D. Linz) and his neighborhood friends: Gerald Johanssen (voiced by Jamil Walker Smith), a street-smart character who generally serves as the leader of the group; and Helga Pataki (Francesca Marie Smith), a girl who bullies Arnold in order to hide the fact that she is in love with him. Bartlett drew inspiration from people he grew up with when creating the characters for the show.

Arnold lives with his eccentric but loving paternal grandparents, Phil Shortman (Dan Castellaneta) and his wife Gertrude Shortman (Tress MacNeille), proprietors of the Sunset Arms boarding house, in the fictional city of Hillwood. In each episode, he helps a schoolmate or boarding house tenant in solving a personal problem or encounters a predicament of his own. Many episodes involve urban legends (usually told by Gerald), such as superheroes or the Headless Horseman.

Other characters include students and faculty at P.S. 118, Arnold's school, and citizens of Hillwood. Certain episodes focus on the lives of supporting characters, such as the tenants of the boarding house that Arnold's grandparents own.

Episodes

Production
Craig Bartlett, the show's creator, was born in Seattle, Washington, which he used as inspiration for the backdrop of Hey Arnold!. He graduated from Anacortes High School and obtained a degree in communications from The Evergreen State College in Olympia, Washington. During high school and college, he studied painting and sculpture at the Museum Art School in Portland. Originally, Bartlett intended to become a painter "in the 19th-century sense", but he became interested in animation during a trip to Italy. His first post-graduation job was at Will Vinton Productions, a claymation studio in Portland.

In 1987, Bartlett relocated to Los Angeles, where he joined a team developing claymation cutaways for the television program Pee-wee's Playhouse. The short segments centered on a character named Penny and her friend Arnold. Bartlett later made three Arnold shorts: Arnold Escapes from Church (1988), The Arnold Waltz (1990), and Arnold Rides a Chair (1991), the latter aired as a filler short on Sesame Street in 1991. The same year, Arnold comic strips also appeared in Simpsons Illustrated magazine by Matt Groening, the creator of The Simpsons, who was also Craig Bartlett's brother-in-law.

Bartlett later joined the staff for Rugrats, where he served as story editor for three years. In 1993, he teamed up with five writers from Rugrats to develop animated projects for Nickelodeon. These meetings were generally difficult and the writers became frustrated; Bartlett recalled: "Our ideas were OK, but such a large and motley group couldn't get far at pitch meetings. Network execs got migraines just counting us coming in the door." As a last resort, Bartlett played the Penny tapes, intending to highlight the Penny character. However, the executives were more impressed by Arnold, despite his status as a minor character. After the meeting, the group began developing Arnold, creating his personality. Bartlett stated: "We did a lot of talking about who Arnold is. We came up with a reluctant hero who keeps finding himself responsible for solving something, making the right choices, doing the right thing." After creating ideas for Arnold, Bartlett began work on the supporting characters, drawing influence from his childhood: "A lot of the characters are an amalgam of people I knew when I was a kid. The girls in Hey Arnold! are girls that either liked or didn't like me when I was in school."

In 1994, Bartlett began work on the pilot episode of Hey Arnold!. A year later, the network decided to begin work on the series. The ten-minute pilot episode, titled Arnold, was shown in theaters on July 10, 1996, before Nickelodeon's first feature-length film, its adaptation of Harriet the Spy. Apart from the animation style, Nick's Arnold wears a sweater, with his plaid shirt untucked (resembling a kilt). Only Arnold's cap remains unchanged from his original clay-animation wardrobe.

Hey Arnold! was Nickelodeon's first animated series to feature kids voiced by actual children instead of adults. As a result of this, many of the boy characters, including Arnold himself, were recast at least once throughout the show's run, due to the child actors reaching puberty. One notable exception to this was Jamil Walker Smith, the voice of Gerald. After Smith's voice changed, auditions for a new actor were held, but the crew felt none of them were suitable replacements. As a result, Smith was kept on as the voice of Gerald, whose voice subsequently changed in-universe with the episode Gerald's Tonsils. This would last until The Jungle Movie, which featured Benjamin Flores Jr. as the voice of Gerald instead.

Production of Hey Arnold! wrapped on December 7, 2001. A dispute over a second then-planned Hey Arnold! movie, The Jungle Movie, resulted in Bartlett leaving Nickelodeon. The last season's episodes were released over four years, beginning on March 4, 2000. The series aired its final episode, unannounced, on June 8, 2004. The Jungle Movie was eventually released as a television film on November 24, 2017.

Broadcast

United States
Hey Arnold! originally aired on Nickelodeon in the United States from October 7, 1996, until June 8, 2004, with reruns until September 1, 2006. In 2002, Nicktoons Network began broadcasting the show, and aired reruns of Hey Arnold! until May 30, 2007, when the show was taken off its nightly schedule. The show aired in reruns on the now-defunct Nick on CBS programming block for two years, from September 14, 2002, to September 4, 2004.

International
Hey Arnold! premiered on October 30, 1996, in the United Kingdom, originally on CITV. Hey Arnold! aired in reruns on Canadian Nickelodeon from September 5, 2011, to August 29, 2022. In 2017, the Kenya Film Classification Board banned Hey Arnold!, together with the cartoon series The Loud House, The Legend of Korra from Nickelodeon, Steven Universe, Clarence and Adventure Time from Cartoon Network, from being broadcast in Kenya. According to the Board, the reason was that these series were "glorifying homosexual behavior".

Critical Reception

Retrospective
In an article for Vox, Caroline Framke praised Hey Arnold’s depiction of adolescence and urban life, stating: "Hey Arnold wove urban legends into its empathetic narrative of how hard it can be to grow up — and how rewarding the process can be when you have some friends and a whole lot of imagination." Rafael Motamayor of /Film echoed that sentiment, writing "Rather than show it as a scary place where every cop show in America is set, Arnold and his friends demonstrated that the city is also a place with endless possibilities, myths, and characters. Not that the show encouraged anything bad; the kids always knew where to go and where not to go. But it showed the reality of millions of kids who grew up in urban areas, and challenged the idea of the perfect American life". Bustle’s Marie Grace Goris suggested the series as the "best Nickelodeon cartoon of all time" and cited sixteen reasons why, such as its diverse characters and its ability to "emotionally stir" viewers.

Home media
Nickelodeon released all five seasons on DVD in Region 1 via Amazon.com through its CreateSpace Manufacture-on-demand program in 2008 and 2009. Season 1 was released on August 21, 2008, Season 2 on August 29, 2008, Season 3 on December 8, 2009, Season 4 on November 27, 2009, and Season 5 on December 4, 2009.

On May 9, 2011, it was announced that Shout! Factory had acquired the rights to the series. They subsequently released Season 1 in a 4-disc set on August 9, 2011. Season 2, Part 1 was released in a 2-disc set on March 20, 2012, followed by Season 2, Part 2 in a 2-disc set on July 24, 2012. Season 3 was released in a 3-disc set on January 29, 2013, as a "Shout Select" title. On May 14, 2013, Season 4 was released in a 2-disc set as a Shout exclusive followed by Season 5 released in a 3-disc set on October 15, 2013, also as a Shout exclusive making the entire series available on DVD. On August 19, 2014, the complete series was released in a 16-disc set through Shout! Factory as a Walmart exclusive. On November 20, 2018, Paramount Home Entertainment released Hey Arnold!: The Ultimate Collection DVD containing all of the previously released episodes and movies now packaged into one set.

In Australia, all five seasons have been released by Beyond Home Entertainment under license from Nickelodeon. A 16-disc collector's edition was released on September 1, 2016, containing all five seasons.

♦ – Shout! Factory select title sold exclusively through Shout's online store.

Films

2002 feature film

In this 2002 feature film, Arnold, Helga and Gerald set out on a quest to save their old neighborhood from a greedy developer who plans on converting it into a huge shopping mall. This film was directed by Tuck Tucker, and featured guest voice talents of Jennifer Jason Leigh, Paul Sorvino and Christopher Lloyd.

In 1998, Nickelodeon gave Craig Bartlett the chance to develop a feature adaptation of the series. As work on the fifth season was completing, Bartlett and company engaged in the production of Arnold Saves the Neighborhood, which would eventually become Hey Arnold!: The Movie.  The Neighborhood project was originally made for television and home video, but executives at Paramount Pictures decided to release it theatrically after successful test screenings.  According to animation historian Jerry Beck (in his Animated Movie Guide), the decision was buoyed by the financial success of the first two Rugrats movies, The Rugrats Movie and Rugrats in Paris: The Movie.

2017 television film

In an interview with Arun Mehta, Craig Bartlett announced that he was working with Nickelodeon on a Hey Arnold! revival. In September 2015, Nickelodeon president Russell Hicks announced that the company was considering revivals for a number of their older shows, including Hey Arnold!. According to an announcement by The Independent, a Hey Arnold! revival is "very much on the cards". On November 23, 2015, Nickelodeon announced that a TV movie is in the works and will pick up right where the series left off. The film will also answer unanswered questions about the fate of Arnold's parents. On March 1, 2016, it was announced that the TV film, The Jungle Movie, would be divided into two parts and would air in 2017. On March 6, 2016, voice actress Nika Futterman confirmed on Twitter that she and her character Olga Pataki would appear in the two-hour film. In June 2016, it was confirmed that the TV film would be titled The Jungle Movie, and that 19 of the original voice actors from the series would lend their voices in the film. New cast-members included Mason Vale Cotton as Arnold; Benjamin "Lil' P-Nut" Flores as Gerald; Gavin Lewis as Eugene; Jet Jurgensmeyer as Stinky; Aiden Lewandowski as Sid; Laya Hayes as Nadine; Nicolas Cantu as Curly; Wally Wingert as Oskar; Stephen Stanton as Pigeon Man; and Alfred Molina as the villain Lasombra. The film debuted on November 24, 2017, on Nickelodeon.

Possible reboot
Before the premiere of The Jungle Movie, Nickelodeon stated that if the ratings of the film would succeed they would consider rebooting the series. Though the ratings were a success with millennials, it ended up missing the mark with Generation Z so the idea of bringing back the show on Nickelodeon was scrapped. However, in August 2018, musical composer for the show Jim Lang revealed in a Tunes/Toons podcast that while Nick will not produce the show at the studio due to the poor ratings of The Jungle Movie, he had this to say: "Netflix, Amazon, Apple were all people that they were going to go out to with the idea of trying to make a season six of Hey Arnold!. We haven't heard anything yet but we've got our fingers crossed." In October 2019, Craig Bartlett revealed in an interview with The Arun Mehta Show that Hey Arnold! could come back as a series with the characters aged up for season 6 if the Rugrats reboot is successful.

Soundtrack
Hey Arnold! The Music, Volume 1 was released on July 3, 2020 as a vinyl record, marking the first-ever official release of the show's music. The soundtrack included 45 minutes of previously unreleased music that had been remastered from the original audio files by Emmy Award-winning sound engineer Dave Marino in conjunction with show composer Jim Lang, as well as new original exclusive artwork done by Bartlett.

References

External links

 
 
 Hey Arnold! at Don Markstein's Toonopedia. Archived from the original on February 5, 2016.

 
1990s American animated television series
1990s American children's comedy television series
1990s American school television series
1990s American sitcoms
2000s American animated television series
2000s American children's comedy television series
2000s American school television series
2000s American sitcoms
1996 American television series debuts
2004 American television series endings
1990s Nickelodeon original programming
2000s Nickelodeon original programming
American animated sitcoms
American children's animated adventure television series
American children's animated comedy television series
English-language television shows
Television series created by Craig Bartlett
Television shows adapted into films
Animated television series about children
Television shows set in Washington (state)
Nicktoons
Elementary school television series